The men's 4 x 400 metres relay at the 1962 European Athletics Championships was held in Belgrade, then Yugoslavia, at JNA Stadium on 16 September 1962.

Medalists

Results

Final
16 September

Heats
16 September

Heat 1

Heat 2

Participation
According to an unofficial count, 48 athletes from 12 countries participated in the event.

 (4)
 (4)
 (4)
 (4)
 (4)
 (4)
 (4)
 (4)
 (4)
 (4)
 (4)
 (4)

References

4 x 400 metres relay
4 x 400 metres relay at the European Athletics Championships